Sever Mureşan (born 23 October 1948) is a former Romanian tennis player. His highest ATP ranking was number 297 achieved on July 29, 1974.

External links

Romanian male tennis players
1948 births
Living people
Place of birth missing (living people)